Black River Township is an inactive township in Wayne County, in the U.S. state of Missouri.

Black River Township takes its name from the Black River.

References

Townships in Missouri
Townships in Wayne County, Missouri